The 2022 Japan Curling Championships (branded as the 39th Zen-Noh Japan Curling Championships) were held from May 22 to 29 at the Tokoro Curling Club in Tokoro, Kitami, Hokkaido, Japan. Both the men's and women's events were played in a round robin format which qualified four teams for a page playoff.

Because of the 2022 Winter Olympics, a World Championship Trial was held in December 2021 between three teams on the men's and women's sides to determine Japan's representatives for the 2022 World Men's Curling Championship and 2022 World Women's Curling Championship. Due to this, the Japan Curling Championships were pushed back later into the year. Instead of the winners qualifying for the upcoming World Championships like usual, the winners of the 2022 Japan Curling Championships qualified as the Japanese representatives for the new Pan Continental Curling Championships.

Summary
On the men's side, SC Karuizawa Club won their first national championship since the team disbanded at the following the 2017–18 season. The new team, skipped by Riku Yanagisawa, went a perfect 8–0 through the round robin portion of the event before losing the 1 vs. 2 page playoff to Sapporo International University, skipped by Hayato Sato. SC Karuizawa Club then defeated Consadole (Yasumasa Tanida) in the semifinal before winning 11–7 in the gold medal game over the Sato rink. Before they disbanded, the original SC Karuizawa Club rink of Yusuke Morozumi, Tsuyoshi Yamaguchi, Tetsuro Shimizu and Kosuke Morozumi won five straight national championships from 2013 to 2018. Now, Yamaguchi is the only player that remains on the team. SC Karuizawa Club is rounded out by second Takeru Yamamoto and lead Satoshi Koizumi. With the win, the team will represent Japan at the Pan Continental Curling Championships in November 2022, their first-time representing Japan at an international event since the 2018 Winter Olympics.

In the women's event, Team Loco Solare, with Satsuki Fujisawa, Chinami Yoshida, Yumi Suzuki, Yurika Yoshida and Kotomi Ishizaki won their third national championship since joining together for the 2015–16 season. Team Fujisawa finished top of the table after the round robin with a 7–1 record and then defeated Hokkaido Bank (Momoha Tabata) 6–4 in the 1 vs. 2 game. In the final, they faced Chubu Electric Power and Team Ikue Kitazawa, who represented Japan at the 2022 World Women's Curling Championship. Loco Solare played a steady game all the way through, never allowing Chubu Electric to score more than a single point in any end. Ultimately, they came out with the 7–3 victory and the title as national champions. Fujisawa formerly played for the Chubu Electric rink until joining Loco Solare in 2015. The team won their first national championship in 2016 and later again in 2020. With the win, Team Fujisawa become the first women's team to win two national titles in the past five years, with Fujikyu, Chubu Electric Power and Hokkaido Bank Fortius winning in 2018, 2019 and 2021 respectively.

Medalists

Men

Qualification
The following teams qualified to participate in the 2022 Japan Curling Championship:

Teams
The teams are listed as follows:

Round-robin standings
Final round-robin standings

Round-robin results

All draws are listed in Japan Standard Time (UTC+09:00).

Draw 2
Sunday, May 22, 13:30

Draw 4
Monday, May 23, 9:00

Draw 6
Monday, May 23, 18:00

Draw 8
Tuesday, May 24, 13:30

Draw 10
Wednesday, May 25, 9:00

Draw 12
Wednesday, May 25, 18:00

Draw 14
Thursday, May 26, 13:30

Draw 16
Friday, May 27, 9:00

Draw 18
Friday, May 27, 18:00

Playoffs

1 vs. 2
Saturday, May 28, 9:00

3 vs. 4
Saturday, May 28, 9:00

Semifinal
Saturday, May 28, 15:00

Final
Sunday, May 29, 9:00

Final standings

Women

Qualification
The following teams qualified to participate in the 2022 Japan Curling Championship:

Teams
The teams are listed as follows:

Round-robin standings
Final round-robin standings

Round-robin results

All draws are listed in Japan Standard Time (UTC+09:00).

Draw 1
Sunday, May 22, 9:00

Draw 3
Sunday, May 22, 18:00

Draw 5
Monday, May 23, 13:30

Draw 7
Tuesday, May 24, 9:00

Draw 9
Tuesday, May 24, 18:00

Draw 11
Wednesday, May 25, 13:30

Draw 13
Thursday, May 26, 9:00

Draw 15
Thursday, May 26, 18:00

Draw 17
Friday, May 27, 13:30

Playoffs

1 vs. 2
Saturday, May 28, 9:00

3 vs. 4
Saturday, May 28, 9:00

Semifinal
Saturday, May 28, 15:00

Final
Sunday, May 29, 16:30

Final standings

References

External links
Official Website
Streaming

2022
2022 in curling
Kitami, Hokkaido
Sport in Hokkaido
2022 in Japanese sport
May 2022 sports events in Japan